Nogales Institute of Technology, or ITN, is a university located in Nogales, Sonora, Mexico.

History 

In 1975, on an international visit to Nogales, the President of Mexico, Luis Echeverría Álvarez met the President of the United States, Gerald Ford.  At the end of the meeting, Álvarez made the official announcement, that a regional technological institute was approved for Nogales beginning in September of that year.

Work began October 1975 of what is now the top house studies, under the name Instituto Tecnológico Regional de Nogales, under the direction of Engineer Rafael Navarro Escobar.  With a population of 224 students and 20 professors, the Institute offered specialties  in Electromechanic Technician, Electronics Technician and Bachelor of Business Administration.
The preparatory level offered the starting specialties: Accounting Technician, Chemistry Lab Technician and Electronics Technician.

In that year (1975), the Department of Planning and Development was formed, implementing guidelines on what should optimize the resources available for the future; the Coordination of Technical and Higher Studies, School Services and General Services were integrated. Offices of  Public Relations and Editorial were established.

The expansion of the institution was initiated under the leadership of Engineer Escobar and the subdirectorate of Engineer, Fedaderico Campos Chacon, due to widespread demand giving a growth of 1566 students to the preparatory level and 222 students at the undergraduate level.

On November 20, 1975, the first board of the Regional Institute of Technology Nogales was formed. At the helm as President, Ernesto Elias Islands, as Secretary, Mendivil Francisco Estrada, as treasurer, Federico Campos Chacon; Dr. Jesus Martinez Ochoa as vice president and Gustavo Montalvo Pompa as prosecretary.

In 1979 the first 7 students graduated from  the Institute, 2 in Industrial Engineering and 5 in Business Administration.

By 1982 and 1983, in an area of 7.9 hectares with the necessary buildings, workshops, laboratories and equipment, the school was operating with a student population of 2028 students, 54% in the undergraduate level and 46% in preparatory level, with 143 teachers and 110  administrative and service staff.

In 1984, a classroom was converted for use as a Computing Center and around mid-year Engineer Marcelino Bauzá Rosete replaced Engineer Almogábar Raul Sanchez as director, continuing as Deputy Director Eng. Jorge Garcia Revilla.

In 1985, D.G.I.T authorized the career in Computer Systems Engineering, starting with 23 students.

In 1985, the Administrative Building and Industrial Engineering Lab were opened. In November of that year, the word "Regional"  was removed, becoming Instituto Tecnológico de Nogales.

Consolidation 

In 1986, the Master Plan for Institutional Development was drafted, searching for a new model for educational excellence to meet the social demands and development of higher education in technology. The establishment of the Center for Graduate and Research and Research-teacher Training Project were also studied.

In 1987, the D.G.I.T. authorized the unit in the Municipality of Agua Prieta, Sonora, as well as the Master of Computer System in the ITN, which began with 15 students.  In August of that year, began the process of segregation of the high school level, suspending registrations for new students.

In early 1990 the functional units that made up the ITN were: Technical Studies Division, Division of Higher Studies, Outreach Division. Coordination of Research, Departments of Educational Technology, Center of Information, Planning, Budget Management, Human Resource Management, School Services, General Services, Communication and Broadcasting Offices and Publisher, and linkage with the productive sector.

In the same year (1990), the entire administrative team was broken into departments. That process meant to optimize and streamline administrative tasks in order to provide a firm support in the academic activities and quality standards.

On September 3, 1996, the D.G.I.T. appointed MS Oscar Armando Lopez Gonzalez as Director of the Instituto Tecnológico de Nogales, MS Juan de Dios Garcia Gerardo became the Academic subdirector and staying at their posts MS Eduardo Sanchez Arellano as an administrator subdirector and engineer Manuel de Jesus Ruiz Beltran in Department of Planning and Outreach.

In 1997, during the graduation ceremony for graduates of ITN, the segregation of Agua Prieta division was announced, to become Instituto Tecnológico de Agua Prieta.

In 2002, M.S Luis Armando Ramirez Cheu received the appointment as Director of the Instituto Tecnológico de Nogales, with the following staff: 
Academic Assistants: Engineer Luis Miguel Paz Moreno and MA. Jose A. Padilla Estrella, Administrative Assistants; B.S. Miguel A. Sarmiento Aguiar and B.S. Arana Guillermo Robles, Deputy Director of Plantation; Engineer Manuel de Jesus Ruiz Beltran and M.S. Gerardo Ochoa Salcido.

Logo 

The school logo was designed by Engineer Jorge Guillermo Zazueta, professor of Industrial Engineering in 1975.

The gear was selected to means movement and gestation, indicating the fundamental objectives of the Technological Institute of the region. The gear, divided into four parts by two axes, contain a transistor, a torch, a microscope and acronyms of the Instituto Tecnológico de Nogales.

The motto of the Institute is La Ciencia y tecnologia para la liberacion del hombre, which means Science and Technology for man's freedom.

Mascot

Since 1975, the mascot of the Institute is the colt.   This mascot was elected by competition among the technology community.

The colt was chosen because it represents freedom and being without borders, yet when it is trained it becomes faithful and obedient. Also with strong ties to family and its territory, it is robust and strong, and has no limits to its imagination and creativity.

Careers 
 Mechatronics Engineering
 Civil Engineering
 Industrial Engineering
 Electronic Engineering
 Computer Systems Engineering
 Business Administration
 Accounting
 Masters of Computer Systems

References

External links
 Nogales Technological Institute website

Nogales, Sonora
Universities and colleges in Sonora
Educational institutions established in 1975
1975 establishments in Mexico